The Novgorod First Chronicle or The Chronicle of Novgorod, 1016–1471 is the oldest extant Rus' chronicle of the Novgorod Republic. Written in Old East Slavic, it reflects a literary tradition about Kievan Rus' which differs from the Primary Chronicle. The later editions of the chronicle reflect the lost Primary Kievan Code (Начальный Киевский свод) of the late 11th century, which contained information not present in the later Primary Chronicle.

The earliest extant copy of the chronicle is the so-called Synod Scroll, dated to the second half of the 13th century. First printed in 1841, it is currently preserved in the State Historical Museum. It is the earliest known manuscript of a major Old East Slavic chronicle, predating the Laurentian Codex of the Primary Chronicle by almost a century. In the 14th century, the Synod Scroll was continued by the monks of the Yuriev Monastery in Novgorod. Other important copies of the Novgorod First Chronicle include the Academic Scroll and Commission Scroll (mid-15th century), both dating to the 1440s.

Contents and style

The chronicle starts from the legendary origins of Rus and its last records refer to mid-15th century events. It describes the accession to the throne of the princes of Novgorod, the elections of major officials such as tysyatsky and posadnik, building of churches and monasteries, epidemics and military campaigns. The chronicle is notable for its focus on local events, lack of stylistic embellishments and the use of local dialect.

Parallels with pagan beliefs
The chronicle describes the actions of the Volkhvs (Magi) who became the leaders of rebellions in 1024 and 1071. Historian Igor Froyanov analysed a scene from the Novgorod First Chronicle in which the Magi talk about the creation of man. According to legend, under the year 1071, two Magi appeared in Novgorod and began to sow turmoil, claiming that soon the Dnieper will flow backwards and the land will move from place to place.

Froyanov was the first to draw attention to the similarity of the text with the Mordovian-Finn legend about the creation of man by God (Cham-Pas) and the devil (Shaitana). In the retelling of Melnikov-Pechersky, this legend sounds like this:

The similarity of the legend with the words of the Magi under the year 1071 (presumably they were of Finnic origin) indicates that the worldview of the Magi of that period was no longer pagan, but was a symbiosis of Christianity with folk beliefs.

Influence
The text of the Novgorod First Chronicle was repeatedly used in other Novgorod chronicles. It became one of the main sources of the so-called Novgorodsko-Sofiysky Svod, which in turn served as the protograph of the Novgorod Fourth Chronicle and Sofia First Chronicle. The Novgorodsko-Sofiysky Svod was included in the all-Russian chronicle of the XV-XVI centuries. Independently it was reflected in the Tver chronicle.

References

Online editions
The Chronicle of Novgorod 1016–1471.  Intr. C. Raymond Beazley, A. A. Shakhmatov (London, 1914)
Pdf scans of the text, in modern spelling
Foreword and text (2000 edition)
Foreword and text (1950 edition)

External links

13th-century manuscripts
13th-century history books
13th century in Russia
14th-century manuscripts
14th-century history books
14th century in Russia
15th-century manuscripts
15th-century history books
15th century in Russia
East Slavic chronicles
Novgorod Republic
History of Russia